Williston Park is an incorporated village in the Town of North Hempstead in Nassau County, on Long Island, in New York, United States. The population was 7,287 at the 2010 census.

History
Williston Park was founded in 1926 when  of land were purchased by New York City developer William Chatlos. Chatlos was seeking to create an affordable, planned community for New York City residents wishing to move to the suburbs. Later that year, residents of the village voted to break with the residents of East Williston and formally incorporate the village. Williston Park is named for Samuel Willis, a settler who came to the area in the late 17th century.  The home of one of Willis's family members stood in the village until the 1950s.

Geography

Demographics

As of the census of 2000, there were 7,261 people, 2,612 households, and 1,959 families residing in the village. The population density was 11,564.8 people per square mile (4,450.0/km2). There were 2,668 housing units at an average density of 4,249.4 per square mile (1,635.1/km2). The racial makeup of the village was 90.22% White, 0.40% African American, 0.06% Native American, 6.98% Asian, 1.35% from other races, and 0.99% from two or more races. Hispanic or Latino of any race were 4.31% of the population.

There were 2,612 households, out of which 33.2% had children under the age of 18 living with them, 61.9% were married couples living together, 9.9% had a female householder with no husband present, and 25.0% were non-families. 20.9% of all households were made up of individuals, and 11.8% had someone living alone who was 65 years of age or older. The average household size was 2.77 and the average family size was 3.27.

In the village, the population was spread out, with 23.3% under the age of 18, 6.8% from 18 to 24, 30.1% from 25 to 44, 23.7% from 45 to 64, and 16.2% who were 69 years of age or older. The median age was 39 years. For every 100 females, there were 88.4 males. For every 100 females age 18 and over, there were 85.4 males.

The median income for a household in the village was $70,737, and the median income for a family was $83,223. Males had a median income of $52,445 versus $37,220 for females. The per capita income for the village was $29,521. About 0.3% of families and 1.9% of the population were below the poverty line, including 0.9% of those under age 18 and 3.5% of those age 69 or over.

Government 
As of September 2021, the Mayor of Williston Park is Paul Ehrbar, the Deputy Mayor is Kevin Rynne, and the Village Trustees are William Carr, William O'Brien, Kevin Rynne, and Michael Uttaro.

Education 
The Village is served by two school districts: the Herricks Union Free School District and the Mineola Union Free School District. There is also St. Aidan's Catholic Elementary lower and upper schools.

Cross Street Elementary School, part of the Mineola Union Free School District, served until 1996 as the police academy for the Nassau County Police Department. The building currently serves as the home of the Schechter School of Long Island Upper School.

The Village has the Williston Park Public Library of the Nassau Library System.

Notable people 
 John D. Caemmerer - Former NY State Senator (deceased)
 Liam McHugh - NBC hockey sportscaster
 Christopher Ruddy - CEO of Newsmax Media, Inc.
 Stephen Schwartz - Composer
 Jaclyn Smith - Paralympic Athlete

References

External links

 Official website
 Chamber of Commerce of the Willistons
 Williston Park Civic Association

Town of North Hempstead, New York
Villages in New York (state)
Villages in Nassau County, New York